Tulis Sutan Sati (1898 in Fort de Kock, West Sumatra, Dutch East Indies – 1942) was one of Indonesian prominent writers of the Balai Pustaka Generation.

List of Novels
 Tak Disangka (1923)
 Sengsara Membawa Nikmat (1928)
 Syair Rosina (1933)
 Tjerita Si Umbut Muda (1935)
 Tidak Membalas Guna
 Memutuskan Pertalian (1978)
 Sabai Nan Aluih: story of Minangkabau heritage (1954)

See also
 Indonesian literature

1898 births
1942 deaths
Minangkabau people
Indonesian writers